Toyama City Gymnasium is an indoor sporting arena located in Toyama, Japan.  The capacity of the arena is 5,000 people.  It hosted some of the group games for the 2003 FIVB Volleyball Men's World Cup.

Facilities
No. 1 arena - 57.6m×44m 2,534m2
No. 2 arena - 38.5m×30m 1,155m2
Gymnastics hall - 800m2
Archery field - 470m2
Boxing room - 127m2
Table tennis room
Running course

Events
Tokyo Girls Collection - July 2018

References

Basketball venues in Japan
Indoor arenas in Japan
Sports venues in Toyama Prefecture
Toyama Grouses
Toyama (city)